James Yancey Jones (born September 30, 1940), known professionally as Tail Dragger Jones, is an American Chicago blues singer. He has performed since the 1960s and released four albums to date.  Jones gained a certain notoriety in 1993, after being convicted of second-degree murder for the killing of another blues musician, Boston Blackie.

Jones, a disciple of Howlin' Wolf, was given his nickname by his hero because of his habit of regularly arriving late at Howlin' Wolf performances.

Life and career
Jones was born in Altheimer, Arkansas. He was raised by his grandparents after his parents separated when he was a baby. He first heard blues music as a child. He secretly listened to music on his family's battery-powered radio, which caused some consternation when the batteries were too low for his family to listen to gospel music before church each Sunday. During those formative years he saw both Sonny Boy Williamson II and Boyd Gilmore perform at a little club named Jack Rabbitts in Pine Bluff, Arkansas. After relocating to Chicago in 1966, Jones worked as an auto mechanic. He began to perform locally but got lucky when his musical hero, Howlin' Wolf, allowed Jones to sit in with him at concerts. This influence, and the raw, gritty approach he had admired in the musical stylings of Sonny Boy Williamson, Muddy Waters, and Willie Dixon, made Jones concentrate on a "low-down" style of Chicago blues.  Originally he was known as Crawlin' James, a nickname he acquired from his habit of crawling around on stage whilst performing. Later on, Howlin' Wolf named him Tail Dragger because Jones often arrived late for gigs. By the early 1970s, Jones had become a full-time singer and he utilised notable backing musicians, including Willie Kent, Hubert Sumlin, Carey Bell, Kansas City Red, Little Mack Simmons, Big Leon Brooks, and Eddie Shaw.

On July 11, 1993, in Chicago, Jones shot and killed the blues artist Boston Blackie following a heated dispute over payment that began a month earlier when both performers appeared at the Chicago Blues Festival. Jones claimed he acted in self-defense but was convicted of second-degree murder and was incarcerated for 17 months of a four-year prison sentence.

Tail Dragger had been a regular performer in Chicago blues clubs throughout the 1970s and 1980s, releasing a number of commercially unsuccessful singles. His spell in prison aside, it took until 1996 before his debut album, Crawlin' Kingsnake, was issued by St. George Records. He was 56 years old when the record was released. It was followed by the album American People (1998, Delmark Records). A DVD, My Head Is Bald: Live at Vern's Friendly Lounge, was released in 2005. Live at Rooster's Lounge was issued in 2009, also by Delmark Records. His joint work with Bob Corritore resulted in the 2012 CD and DVD release Longtime Friends in the Blues.

Family
Jones has been married six times and has a number of children.

Discography

Albums

See also
List of Chicago blues musicians
List of electric blues musicians

References

1940 births
Living people
American blues singers
Chicago blues musicians
Blues musicians from Arkansas
Electric blues musicians
20th-century American singers
21st-century American singers
Singers from Arkansas
People from Jefferson County, Arkansas
20th-century American male singers
21st-century American male singers
American people convicted of murder
People convicted of murder by Illinois